is a Japanese speed skater. She competed at the 1994 Winter Olympics and the 1998 Winter Olympics.

References

External links

1969 births
Living people
Japanese female speed skaters
Olympic speed skaters of Japan
Speed skaters at the 1994 Winter Olympics
Speed skaters at the 1998 Winter Olympics
Sportspeople from Hokkaido
Speed skaters at the 1990 Asian Winter Games
Universiade silver medalists for Japan
Universiade medalists in speed skating
Competitors at the 1991 Winter Universiade
20th-century Japanese women
21st-century Japanese women